Grevillea humilis is a species of flowering plant in the family Proteaceae and is endemic to eastern New South Wales. It is an erect to spreading shrub with narrowly elliptic to more or less linear leaves, and pink or white flowers.

Description

Taxonomy
Grevillea humilis was first formally described in 2000 by Robert Owen Makinson in the Flora of Australia from specimens collected near the Bucketts Way in 1985. The specific epithet (humilis) means "low or small".

In the same publication, Makinson described three subspecies of G. humilis and the names are accepted by the Australian Plant Census:

Distribution and habitat
Grevillea humilis occurs in the Glass House Mountains of south-eastern Queensland and south through the coast and nearby ranges of eastern New South Wales. Subspecies humilis grows in woodland in the lower Hunter region of New South Wales, inland as far as Scone. Subspecies lucens grows in open forest or woodland in the Glass House Mountains in Queensland and on the far North Coast of New South Wales. Subspecies maritima grows in heath in rocky places in heath on the North Coast of New South Wales as far north as Bundjalung National Park.

References

humilis
Proteales of Australia
Flora of New South Wales
Flora of Queensland
Taxa named by Robert Owen Makinson
Plants described in 2000